Tanja Scholz (born 29 June 1984) is a German swimmer, who won three events at the 2022 World Para Swimming Championships.

Personal life
Scholz is from Elmshorn, Schleswig-Holstein, Germany. She has three children. Scholz was diagnosed with paraplegia after a horse riding accident in June 2020, and has been wheelchair bound since. At the time, she was told that she would not be able to swim due to the extent of her injuries.

Career
Scholz started competing in competitive para swimming in January 2021; prior to her accident, she had been a competitive able bodied swimmer. Scholz was the top athlete at the six event 2022 Para Swimming World Series. At the World Series event in Aberdeen, Scotland, she set the world record in the 100 metres freestyle S4 competition.

Scholz won five medals at the 2022 World Para Swimming Championships. She won the 50, 100 and 200 metre freestyle S4 events and came second in the 50 metre backstroke S4 and 150 metre medley SM3 competitions. She competed in the 150 metres medley event 26 minutes after her 100 metres freestyle victory.

References

External links
IPC Profile
Team Deutschland

1984 births
Living people
German female freestyle swimmers
German female backstroke swimmers
People from Elmshorn
Sportspeople from Schleswig-Holstein
Medalists at the World Para Swimming Championships
S4-classified Paralympic swimmers